Red Run Lodge was a historic hotel complex located at Washington Township, Franklin County, Pennsylvania, USA. The complex consists of 16 contributing buildings and one contributing structure (stone wall). The buildings are the lodge, cabins, bath house and fruit stand. The buildings were built in 1939, and are constructed of chestnut logs with concrete chinking in a "log cabin" style. The lodge and cabins closed about 1965.

It was listed on the National Register of Historic Places in 1996.

The building was torn down in December 2017.

References 

Hotel buildings on the National Register of Historic Places in Pennsylvania
Hotel buildings completed in 1939
Buildings and structures in Franklin County, Pennsylvania
National Register of Historic Places in Franklin County, Pennsylvania
Demolished buildings and structures in Pennsylvania
Buildings and structures demolished in 2017